Aditya 369 is a 1991 Indian Telugu-language science fiction film written and directed by Singeetam Srinivasa Rao. It is considered to be the first time travel film made in Indian cinema. The film stars Nandamuri Balakrishna and Mohini while Amrish Puri, Tinnu Anand, and Suthivelu play supporting roles. The music was composed by Ilaiyaraaja and Jandhyala wrote the dialogues. The film was produced by S. Anitha Krishna on Sridevi Movies banner with S. P. Balasubrahmanyam as the presenter. Upon release, the film received critical acclaim and was a commercial success. It received two Nandi Awards. Aditya 369 is considered a landmark film in the science fiction genre in Indian cinema. The film explored dystopian and post-apocalyptic themes in a satirical manner.

Inspired by the H. G. Wells' novel The Time Machine (1895) which he read as a student, Singeetam Srinivasa Rao started working on a script in which the protagonist travels to the past and the future. He opted for Sri Krishnadevaraya's reign for the past period. After researching at the American Library in Madras about the future, he finished the script.

Made on a budget of 1.52 crore, principal photography of the film took about 110 days. Sets related to Krishnadevaraya's era were built at Annapurna Studios in Hyderabad. Filming also took place at VGP Golden Beach and Vijaya Vauhini Studios in Madras. Forest scenes were shot at Talakona in Andhra Pradesh. Three cinematographers worked for the film and shot different time periods. P. C. Sreeram shot the scenes related to present-day but he opted out due to ill-health. V. S. R. Swamy and Kabir Lal performed rest of the cinematography. It was dubbed into Hindi as Mission 369 and into Tamil as Apoorva Sakthi 369.

Plot 

The film begins in 1991, Prof. Ramdas a scientist strives hard with enormous experiments and invents a time machine that travels in time. Raja Varma, a high-profile thief has a peculiar hobby of stealing antique pieces from world-renowned museums. He desires to possess a 16th-century diamond of the Vijayanagara Empire from the Salar Jung Museum. So, he plots by conniving with the curator. At the same time, some school children visit an excursion to the museum in which a naughty kid Kishore misplaces and spends the night there. He witnesses the robbery committed by Raja Varma’s henchmen Vasu and Dasu. The two chase him when he is guarded by a gallant Krishna Kumar who admits him to the hospital. Krishna Kumar loves Hema, the daughter of Prof. Ramadas. Hema considers her father’s experiment futile. When Krishna Kumar visits their house, Ramadas presents his time machine but it breaks down. 

Later, Krishna Kumar meets Kishore, and they become cordial. Kishore keeps on saying about the theft which no one believes. Vasu and Dasu go to the hospital to kill Kishore but in vain. In the interim, Kishore is acquainted with Ramadas via Hema and acquires knowledge of the time machine. Plus, he learns that they can travel to the day of the robbery. One night, Kishore secretly visits Ramadas's residence joins the remaining children in the hospital and starts the time machine. Being cognizant of it, Krishna Kumar and Hema rescue them but get struck and it takes off. Parallelly, as an anecdote, a police constable hunting a thief is also trapped in the machine. 

Now they reach 1526 the reign of the emperor Krishnadevaraya. Forthwith, Krishna Kumar saves a dancer in the royal court Simhanandini from a raid who invites them to the fort. Accordingly, they proceed when they come across various historical characters. Whereat, Krishna Kumar surprises Krishnadevaraya by reciting the poem of his court's poet Tenali Ramakrishna before it's even written. Simhanandini introduces him to the emperor who states that they have come from the future. Though Krishnadevaraya finds it hard to believe, he yet offers them hospitality. After a while, Krishna Kumar catches sight of the stolen diamond in the prayer room of the emperor which belongs to their ancestors and they adore it. Krishnadevaraya proclaims that it has divine power which reflects on eve of Karthika Punnami when moonlight falls on the diamond. Moreover, it prophesied that the diamond would be stolen twice, during Krishnadevaraya's rule and again after 500 years. Fascinated by it, they stay back to witness the event.

Meanwhile, Simhanandini lusts Krishna Kumar and lures him but he turns her down. Further, Krishnadevaraya is aware of Narsa Kavi's arrival which worries him. At that juncture, Krishna Kumar predicts victory is over and also supports Tenali Ramakrishna to triumph. The delighted Emperor decides to greatly honor him. Begruded Simhanandini ruses and pauses it by accusing Krishna Kumar has deceived her. After a heated argument, Krishna Kumar says Hema is the best dancer than her when the emperor organizes a competition. Hema wins over and Simhanandini is dethroned. At that point, Krishnadevaraya grants to bestow anything when they request to view the diamond's effect on Karthika Punnami. Thusly, the emperor gives the guest of honor to them. Krishna Kumar & Hema are enthralled when the diamond radiates seven colors of the rainbow because of the moonlight. 

Following, Krishna Kumar gets ready to retrieve when to seek revenge, Simhanandini colludes with Senadhipathi and incriminates Krishna Kumar in the diamond robbery. Tenali Ramakrishna senses it but he is seized. Hence infuriated Krishnadevaraya sentences him to death but while executing he guards him. Since Krishnadevaraya internally believes Krishna Kumar is innocent and he confirms it through Tenali Ramakrishna. Presently, Krishna Kumar absconds and broads on the time machine with Hema, & the constable sets off again. As of today, they land in 2504, a dystopian world destroyed by radiation after the end of the Third World War. Scientists of that era who already know about their arrival, receive them. In this era, the entire city is built underground where finds several wonders in the future. 

However, a risk is lurking for them as they can live in that time only for 8 hours in this climate. Here, they notice Krishnadevaraya's diamond through which power is supplied and also watch the news from the year 1991. It reports that the diamond is retrieved from Raja Varma with the efforts of Krishna Kumar but tragically he died in the process. The malfunctioning time machine is now repaired and when the environment begins to negatively affect them, they leave and back to the present. As per, they got wind Raja Varma abducts Prof.Ramdas and Kishore to get hold of the time machine. Krishna Kumar rescues them and combats Raja Varma who locates the time machine on a hilltop. It blasts in the feud and both are reported dead. At last, Krishna Kumar backs safely by jumping off the cliff moments before it explodes when it is revealed that they fail to get complete information in the future. Finally, the movie ends on a happy note.

Cast 

 Balakrishna Nandamuri as Krishna Kumar and Krishnadevaraya (dual role)
 Mohini as Hema (dubbed by S. P. Sailaja)
 Silk Smitha as Simha Nandani
 Amrish Puri as Raja Varma
 Tinnu Anand as Prof. Ramdas (dubbed by S. P. Balasubrahmanyam)
 Suthivelu as Police Constable
 Master Tarun as Kishore
 Chandra Mohan as Tenali Ramakrishna
 J. V. Somayajulu as Timmarusu
 Brahmanandam as Scientist
 Subhalekha Sudhakar as Scientist
 Raavi Kondala Rao as Scientist
 Gollapudi Maruti Rao as Curator
 Chalapathi Rao as Senadhipathi
 Tanikella Bharani as Raja Varma's henchman
 Babu Mohan as Raja Varma's henchman
 Annapoorna as Dr. Lalita
 Sri Lakshmi as Madhavi
 Baby Raasi as Kishore's friend
 Kinnera as Tirumala Devi
 Potti Prasad as Bhatudu

Production

Development 
Aditya 369 was inspired by the H. G. Wells novel The Time Machine (1895), which Singeetam Srinivasa Rao read as a student. Though the film has frequently been compared to Back to the Future (1985), according to Rao the similarities between the two stop "with the trouble that the protagonist faces in a different time zone".

Rao briefly discussed his story about time travel with S. P. Balasubrahmanyam who immediately liked it. Balasubrahmanyam recommended Nandamuri Balakrishna's name as he felt that Balakrishna would apt be for Krishnadevaraya's role. Balasubrahmanyam's relative Sivalenka Krishna Prasad who had bulk dates of Balakrishna agreed to produce the film. Several titles including Kaalayantram and Yuga Purushudu were considered, however, Aditya 369 was finalised symbolizing Aditya (the Sun) and the time machine's serial number 369 which was chosen as an increasing series symbolising time travel.

Cast and crew 
The makers initially approached Vijayashanti as the lead actress but she could not sign the film due to scheduling conflicts. Later, they cast cinematographer P. C. Sreeram's relative Mohini in her place. Three cinematographers worked for the film who shot different time periods. Sreeram shot the scenes related to present-day but he opted out due to ill-health. V. S. R. Swamy and Kabir Lal performed rest of the cinematography. Jandhyala had written the dialogues for this film. While Amrish Puri played the prime antagonist, Tinnu Anand, Suthivelu, Chandra Mohan, and Silk Smita played important roles. The then child artiste, Tarun played a plot moving role.

Filming 
Made on a budget of 1.52 crore, principal photography of the film took about 110 days. Sets related to Krishnadevaraya's era were erected at Annapurna Studios in Hyderabad. Filming also took place at VGP Golden Beach and Vijaya Vauhini Studios in Madras. Forest scenes were shot at Talakona in Andhra Pradesh.

Music 

Music composed by Ilaiyaraaja. Music released on LEO Music Company. For the song "Janavule", Rao wanted a tune similar to the old historical films. Jikki was chosen to sing this song, Rao recalled that S. Janaki who was in studio stayed up till the end of song's recording to help Jikki with her lines.

Themes 
Aditya 369 is considered as the first Indian film based on time travel. It dealt with exploratory dystopian and apocalyptic themes.

Release and reception
The film released on 18 July 1991. It received positive reviews and was a commercial success. It was dubbed and released in Tamil as Aboorva Sakti-369 during August 1992.

Legacy 
Aditya 369 is considered a landmark film in the science fiction genre in Telugu cinema and Indian cinema. In September 2020, The News Minute's Balakrishna Ganeshan wrote, "[The film] is considered to be a masterpiece because it perfectly blended the genre of sci-fi and drama with the mainstream template of songs and fight sequences to make it an entertaining watch. It also unlocked the imagination of scores of people to look beyond our realm by popularising Albert Einstein’s theories of time and relativity." Actor and producer Nandamuri Kalyan Ram cited Aditya 369 as one of his favourite films and an inspiration for producing the film Bimbisara (2022).

Future 
In January 2017, Rao announced his intention to work on Aditya 369's sequel. It is reported that the sequel would feature Balakrishna along with his son Mokshagna.

Awards
Nandi Awards
 Best Art Director - Peketi Ranga
 Best Costume Designer - A. Samba Siva Rao

See also 
 Science fiction films in India

References

External links 
 

1990s avant-garde and experimental films
1990s dystopian films
1990s heist films
1990s science fiction adventure films
1990s Telugu-language films
1991 films
Apocalyptic films
Films about time travel
Films directed by Singeetam Srinivasa Rao
Films scored by Ilaiyaraaja
Films set in 1991
Films set in the 1520s
Films set in the 21st century
Films set in the 26th century
Films set in the future
Films set in the Vijayanagara Empire
History of India on film
Indian avant-garde and experimental films
Indian films with live action and animation
Indian heist films
Indian post-apocalyptic films
Indian science fiction adventure films
Indian science fiction films